The spearsnouted grenadier (Coelorinchus labiatus) is a species of fish in the family Macrouridae.

Description

The spearsnouted grenadier is greyish in colour, with the mouth, gill cavities and first dorsal fin blackish. It has two dorsal spines and the photophore is short and not visible externally.

Habitat

Behaviour
The spearsnouted grenadier feeds on crustaceans and small fish. It lives up to 10 years.  Lepidapedon arlenae and Derogenes varicus are parasitic upon it.

References

Macrouridae
Fish described in 1896